This is a list of notable people who were either born or lived in Ontario, Canada, or have spent a large part or formative part of their career in that province.

Film, television, and voice actors

Artists
Troy Brooks (born 1972 in Chatham, Ontario) — painter

Comedians

Kurtis Conner – Hamilton
Derek Edwards – Timmins
Dave Foley – Etobicoke
Evan Fong – Toronto
Tom Green – Pembroke
Phil Hartman – Brantford
Jenny Jones – London
Mike MacDonald – Ottawa
Norm Macdonald – Ottawa
Howie Mandel – Toronto
Mark McKinney – Ottawa
Russell Peters – Brampton
Katherine Ryan – Sarnia
Ron Sparks - Chatham-Kent
Scott Thompson – North Bay
Harland Williams – Toronto
John Wing Jr. – Sarnia

Professional athletes
Caleb Agada (born 1994) - Nigerian-Canadian basketball player in the Israeli Premier League and for the Nigerian national basketball team
Bolade Ajomale – Olympic sprinter from Richmond Hill
Sean Avery – retired hockey player from North York
Alon Badat (born 1989) - Israeli soccer player from Thornhill
Josh Bailey - hockey player, New York Islanders – Bowmanville
Rowan Barrett - basketball player from Scarborough, top scorer in the 2002 Israel Basketball Premier League
Anthony Bennett – basketball player from Toronto
Sam Bennett – hockey player from Holland Landing
Shane Bergman – CFL player from Waterford
Reno Bertoia (1935–2011) – Major League baseball player from Windsor
Tajon Buchanan (born 1999) – soccer player – Brampton
Tomer Chencinski (born 1984) – Israeli-Canadian football player from Thornhill
Steve Christie – Hamilton
Mike Craig – Thorndale
Laura Creavalle – Toronto
Nick Denis – North Bay
Andre De Grasse – Olympic sprinter from Scarborough
Phil Esposito – Sault Ste. Marie
Tony Esposito – Sault Ste. Marie
Simon Farine – basketball player from Toronto
 Sharon Fichman (born 1990) – Canadian/Israeli tennis player from Toronto
Mike Fisher – hockey player from Peterborough
Rick Fox – Toronto
 Mark Friedman (born 1995) - NHL player from Toronto
Greg Gardner (born 1975) - ice hockey player and coach
Shai Gilgeous-Alexander (born 1998) – Toronto
Doug Gilmour – Kingston
Claude Giroux – Hearst
Wayne Gretzky (born 1961) – Brantford
Brooke Henderson (born 1997) - Smiths Falls
Jack Hendrickson (born 1936) - National Hockey League player from Kingston, Ontario and Midland, Ontario
James Hinchcliffe – Oakville
Tim Horton – Cochrane
Jack Hughes (born 2001) – NHL ice hockey player from Toronto
Zach Hyman (born 1992) – NHL ice hockey player from Forest Hill
Cory Joseph – Pickering
Curtis Joseph – Keswick
 Nazem Kadri (born 1990) – NHL player – London
 David Levin (born 1999) - Israeli ice hockey player – Toronto
 Jesse Levine (born 1987) - American-Canadian tennis player – Ottawa
 Alex "Mine Boy" Levinsky (1910–1990) – NHL hockey player – Toronto
Eric Lindros (born 1973) – London
Jamaal Magloire – Toronto
Frank Mahovlich – Timmins
Connor McDavid – Newmarket
Jamal Murray – basketball, Kitchener
Rick Nash – Brampton
Josh Naylor – Mississauga
Daniel Nestor – Toronto
Bobby Orr – Parry Sound
Pete Orr – Richmond Hill
 Bob Plager – hockey player, Kirkland Lake
Milos Raonic – tennis player – Thornhill
 Samuel Rothschild (1899–1987) – ice hockey player – Sudbury
Jim Rutherford – Beeton
Samuel Schachter (born 1990), Olympic volleyball player
Denis Shapovalov (born 1999) – Israeli-Canadian tennis player – Vaughan
Patrick Sharp – Thunder Bay
 Simisola Shittu (born 1999) - British-born Canadian basketball player for Ironi Ness Ziona of the Israeli Basketball Premier League - Burlington
Darryl Sittler (born 1950) – Kitchener
Trevor Smith (born 1985) – hockey player – Ottawa
Eric Staal – Thunder Bay
Jordan Staal – Thunder Bay
Marc Staal – Thunder Bay
Steven Stamkos – Markham
 Andrew Sznajder (born 1967) – English-born Canadian tennis player – Oakville 
Tristan Thompson – Brampton
Joe Thornton – St. Thomas
Raffi Torres – Toronto
Paul Tracy – Scarborough
 Mike Veisor (born 1952) – hockey player – Toronto
Joey Votto (born 1983) – baseball player – Etobicoke
Andrew Wiggins (born 1995) – Toronto
Nigel Wilson (born 1970) – Oshawa

Politicians

Laura Curran
Philip Downing
Stephen Harper – 22nd Prime Minister of Canada (2006–2015) and former Conservative Party leader – Leaside
John T. Jarvis
William Lyon Mackenzie King - 10th Prime Minister of Canada (1921-26, 1926-30, 1935-48) Longest serving Prime Minister in Canadian history - Berlin now Kitchener.
Paul Martin – 21st Prime Minister of Canada (2003–2006) – Windsor
James McMillan – Hamilton
Lester B. Pearson - 14th Prime Minister of Canada (1963-1968) - Newtonbrook
Justin Trudeau – 23rd Prime Minister of Canada (2015–present) – Ottawa

Olympic athletes

Alex Baumann – Sudbury
Nathan Brannen – Cambridge
Patrick Chan – Ottawa
Gabrielle Daleman – Newmarket
Victor Davis – Guelph
Meagan Duhamel – Sudbury
Lori Dupuis – South Glengarry
John Fitzpatrick – Toronto
Chris Jarvis – Grimsby
Becky Kellar – Hagersville
Rosie MacLennan – King City
Conlin McCabe – Brockville
Scott Moir – London
Penny Oleksiak – Toronto
Brian Orser – Belleville
Elvis Stojko – Richmond Hill
Adam van Koeverden – Oakville
Tessa Virtue – London
Simon Whitfield – Kingston

Other notable celebrities

Thalia Assuras – London
Samantha Bee – Toronto
Don Cherry – Kingston
William Winer Cooke – Brantford
Adam Copeland – Orangeville
Linda Evangelista – St. Catharines
Melyssa Ford – Toronto
Frank Gehry – Toronto
Danielle Graham – Guelph
Chris Hadfield – astronaut, Sarnia and Milton
Shalom Harlow – Oshawa
James Hobson – engineer and Youtuber, Kitchener
Michiel Horn – Toronto
Peter Jennings – Toronto
Lynn Johnston – Collingwood
Jason Jones – Hamilton
Gail Kim – Toronto
Lisa LaFlamme – Kitchener
Ferdinand Larose – created the Larose Forest, Prescott and Russell
Lainey Lui – Toronto
Steve Mackall – Toronto
Lorne Michaels – Toronto
Alice Munro – Wingham
Daniel Negreanu – poker player, Toronto
Kevin Newman – Toronto
Jordan Peterson – professor, Toronto
Quddus – Toronto
James Randi – Toronto
Ivan Reitman – Hamilton
Jason Reso – Orangeville
Sandie Rinaldo – Toronto
John Roberts – Toronto
Lloyd Robertson – Stratford
Morley Safer – Toronto
David Shore – London
Lilly Singh – Toronto
Trish Stratus – Richmond Hill
John Saunders – sports reporter, from Ajax and other cities
Alex Trebek – Sudbury
Jack L. Warner – London
Ken Westerfield – disc sports (Frisbee) pioneer, from Toronto
Lauren Williams – Toronto

Bands, musicians, singers, and rappers

Lee Aaron – Belleville
Annihilator (band) – Ottawa
Bryan Adams – Kingston
Alexisonfire – St. Catharines
Paul Anka – Ottawa
Eva Avila – Ottawa
Barenaked Ladies – Scarborough
Justin Bieber – Stratford
Billy Talent – Mississauga
Jully Black – Toronto
Blue Rodeo – Toronto
Broken Social Scene – Toronto
Cancer Bats – Toronto
Candi & The Backbeat – North York
Alessia Cara – Mississauga
Keshia Chanté – Ottawa
Bruce Cockburn – Ottawa
Deborah Cox – Toronto
deadmau5 – Niagara Falls; real name Joel Thomas Zimmerman
Hugh Dillon – Kingston
Fefe Dobson – Scarborough
Drake – Toronto
Finger Eleven – Burlington
Five Man Electrical Band – Ottawa
J.D. Fortune – Mississauga
Nelly Furtado – Forest Hill, Toronto
Glenn Gould – Toronto 
Dallas Green – St. Catharines
Hail the Villain – Oshawa
Sarah Harmer – Burlington
illScarlett – Mississauga
Jeon Somi (born 2001) – Windsor
Kardinal Offishall – Toronto
Vikas Kohli – Mississauga
James LaBrie – Penetanguishene
Henry Lau – Toronto
Avril Lavigne – Belleville and Greater Napanee
Gordon Lightfoot – Orillia
Lights – Timmins
Little X – Toronto
Guy Lombardo – London
Brian Melo – Hamilton
Shawn Mendes – Pickering
Alice Merton – Oakville
Metric – Toronto
Kim Mitchell – Sarnia
Alanis Morissette – Ottawa
My Darkest Days – Toronto
The Partland Brothers – Colgan
Our Lady Peace – Toronto
Peaches – Toronto
Protest the Hero – Whitby
Anastasia Rizikov – Toronto
Rush – Toronto
Saga – Oakville
Paul Shaffer – Thunder Bay
Sheriff – Toronto
Silverstein – Burlington
Snow – Toronto
Wendy Son – Richmond Hill
Sum 41 – Ajax
Skye Sweetnam – Bolton
Teenage Head – Hamilton
Three Days Grace – Toronto
Tokyo Police Club – Newmarket
The Tragically Hip – Kingston
Shania Twain – Windsor
U.S.S. (Ubiquitous Synergy Seeker) – Stouffville, Markham and Toronto
Vanity – Niagara Falls
Walk off the Earth – Burlington
Tamia Washington – Windsor
The Weeknd – Scarborough
Michelle Wright – Merlin
Neil Young – Toronto
Daniel Caesar – Toronto

Authors

Margaret Atwood – Ottawa and Toronto
James Cameron – Kapuskasing and Niagara Falls
Julie Czerneda – Mississauga
Earl Doherty – Ottawa
Malcolm Gladwell – Kitchener-Waterloo
Alistair MacLeod – Windsor
Michael Ondaatje – Toronto
Robert J. Sawyer – Mississauga
Eric Walters – Toronto

Scientists and physicians

Sir Frederick Banting – co-discoverer of insulin
Dr. Charles Best – co-discoverer of insulin
Dr. Norman Bethune – physician, pioneered the use of in-field blood transfusions during the Spanish Civil War, joined the Communist guerillas in China in the 1930s
Dr. Roberta Bondar – astronaut, neurologist, from Sault Ste. Marie
Dr. Robert Buckman – oncologist, president of Humanist Association of Canada
Mathew Evans – inventor, created and patented the first incandescent light bulb in 1874, five years before Thomas Edison's US patent
Dr. Wilbur Franks – physician and inventor; developed first anti-gravity or "G-suit" now used by air crews and astronauts; also noted for his work in cancer research
Dr. James Naismith – physician, inventor of basketball
Daniel David Palmer – founder of chiropractic

Business people

Criminals
 Paul Bernardo
 Edwin Alonzo Boyd – led the Boyd Gang in Toronto
 Karla Homolka

See also
 List of University of Toronto people

References